In mathematics, the Veblen ordinal is either of two large countable ordinals:

The small Veblen ordinal
The large Veblen ordinal

See also 

Veblen function